10 Dorchester Drive is a 1935 art deco style house in Herne Hill, south London, England, designed by Kemp and Tasker, with the builders Messrs Morrell of Bromley. In February 2022, an emergency Building Preservation Notice was put in place, as the building was threatened with imminent demolition. In June the same year it was Grade II listed.

Background 

In 1934, Leslie H. Kemp and Frederick E. Tasker won the Ideal House Competition, to design a home for the Daily Mail Ideal Home Exhibition. Their design used the moderne branch of the art deco style that was then in vogue. A mock-up "show home" was constructed for the 1935 exhibition, at Olympia, London, in a display called "Village of Tomorrow".

One feature of the design was that the two downstairs reception rooms could be combined with the hallway, to feature as a ballroom.

The house  

The five-bedroom house on Dorchester Drive, constructed in 1935–1936 by the speculative builders and twin brothers Cyril and Stanley Morrell (born 1908), is one of only three examples of the design built. The building was constructed with its plan at an angle to the street, rather than the more usual parallel alignment. It retains several of its original features, including the bathroom fittings, iron staircase, Crittall windows and a roof terrace.

Legal protection 

The house was placed on the market in September 2021, having been owned by one family for 60 years. Once it was sold, noting the attractiveness of its site to property developers and consequently the likely threat of its demolition, The Twentieth Century Society, the Herne Hill Society, and several individuals campaigned for its preservation. On 24 February 2022, Lambeth Council issued a Building Preservation Notice, preventing alteration or demolition, on pain of criminal prosecution. The order would have remained in effect for six months, but in June 2022, the house was Grade II listed, giving it permanent protection.

Residents 

The house was the home of psychologist Hans Eysenck from 1960 until his death in 1997, and remained occupied by his widow Sybil until she died in 2020.

Notes

References

Further reading 

 
 
 

Art Deco architecture in England
Herne Hill
1934 architecture
Houses in the London Borough of Lambeth
Buildings and structures completed in 1936
Moderne architecture
Grade II listed houses in London